All Saints Church is a redundant Anglican church in the village of All Saints' South Elmham, one of a group of villages jointly known as The Saints, in Suffolk, England.  It is recorded in the National Heritage List for England as a designated Grade I listed building, and is under the care of the Churches Conservation Trust.

The church stands in an isolated position at the end of a lane adjacent to the moated Church Farm. It is one of around 40 round-tower churches in Suffolk.

History

All Saints is included in the district of South
Elmham. "This district includes nine parishes and forms a subdivision of the
Hundred of Wangford, anciently called the liberty, manor, or township of South
Elmham. It was granted by Sigebert [Sigeberht], King of the East Angles [Anglia], to Felix the Burgundian,
his first bishop, who fixed his see at Dunwich in 630 A.D.." Several parish churches
were founded here in Saxon times, All Saints being one of them.

During the reign of Henry VIII the seat was seized in
exchange for other lands. In the Cotton Manuscripts, Nero C. ix, is an
indenture between Henry VII and Edward North, Esq., Treasurer of the Court of
Augmentations, dated 4 December 1540, where in exchange for land in the county
of Buckingham, North was given rights to the manor as well as the parish
churches of Saint James, Saint Peter, Saint Margarette, Saint Nicholas and All
Saints of South Elmham. The land was possessed from the thirty-second year of
the reign of Henry VII until the reign of King James I by the North family. It
was then conveyed to Sir John Tasburgh, Knight, 20 May 1613, the manor with
the rectories and all the demesnes. The descendants of Sir John retained the
lordship of South Elmham until the male line died out and it was passed to the
Wybornes. The estate was then purchased about 1753 by  William Adair, Esq.

All Saints dates from the 12th century.  The south aisle was added in about 1250, or slightly earlier.  Further additions and alterations took place in the 14th, 15th and 17th centuries.  The church was "considerably restored" in 1870.  The churchyard is currently cared for by the Suffolk Wildlife Trust.

All Saints was frequently called All-Hallows. It was consolidated with the parish of St. Nicholas on December 8, 1737, totaling 1620 acres. The population of All Saints, in 1841, was 224 persons.

Architecture

Exterior
The church is constructed in flint with freestone dressings, and has a lead roof.  Its plan consists of a continuous nave and chancel, with a south aisle which runs along the whole length of the nave and chancel, a south porch, and a west tower.  The tower is on three stages, and is round in cross-section up to its summit.  At one time the top stage was octagonal, but in 1846 it had been "recently removed". In the bottom stage is a west Norman window, and in the middle stage are small round-headed windows.  In the top stage the bell openings are also round-headed and have louvres.  The parapet is battlemented.  Along the north wall of the body of the church are three single-light Norman windows, three 13th-century two-light windows, two 14th-century single-light windows, and a blocked doorway.  The 14th-century windows contain Perpendicular tracery.  The east window has three lights.  On the south wall of the aisle are three windows with Y-tracery.  The porch dates from the medieval period, but the south doorway is Romanesque Revival from the Victorian era.

Interior
The arcade between the nave and the south aisle dates from the 14th century.  In the chancel is a piscina in Early English style which has been much restored.  The font dates from the 12th century.  It consists of a large square bowl carved with blank arches, supported by a central column and four smaller columns, standing on a rectangular base.  There is a variety of benches.  Two of these date from the 15th century, are carved with poppyheads and animals. They were originally in the porch, and consequently are weathered.  Others, also dating from the 15th century, are carved with poppyheads only, and the rest are 19th-century reproductions.  The single-manual organ is at the east end of the south aisle.  It was built in 1884 By Eustace Ingram.

See also
List of churches preserved by the Churches Conservation Trust in the East of England

Notes

References

Grade I listed churches in Suffolk
Church of England church buildings in Suffolk
English churches with Norman architecture
English Gothic architecture in Suffolk
Churches preserved by the Churches Conservation Trust
Waveney District
Round towers